This article concerns the period 409 BC – 400 BC.

References